West Gippsland Football League may refer to:

 West Gippsland Football Netball League (netball and Australian-rules football)
 Gippsland Football League, formerly known as the "West Gippsland Latrobe Football League" (Australian-rules football)